is a swimming venue in Yokohama, Japan. The main pool is converted to a basketball arena in fall and winter by setting up panels on the floor. This sports court can be slippery.  This arena is home of the B.League basketball club Yokohama B-Corsairs.

Events
 2002 Pan Pacific Swimming Championships
 2006 FINA Synchronised Swimming World Cup

Gallery

References

External links
 Official website

Basketball venues in Japan
Sports venues in Yokohama
Swimming venues in Japan
Indoor arenas in Japan
Yokohama B-Corsairs
Sports venues completed in 1998
1998 establishments in Japan